Henri Falcón Fuentes (born 19 June 1961) is a Venezuelan politician. He was mayor for two consecutive terms of Barquisimeto, Iribarren Municipality (2000–2008) and governor of Lara State (2008–2017). He was a candidate in the 2018 Venezuelan presidential election.

Background
Falcón was born in Nirgua, located north of the state capital, San Felipe, Venezuela. Falcón began his secondary studies at Valencia, Carabobo State,  Venezuela until he entered in the armed forces of Venezuela in Caracas as non-commissioned officer of the army. He left the army with the rank of Maestro Técnico de Primera (the third highest of the eight ranks of sub-officials in the Venezuelan military). In 1987 he married Marielba Díaz, with whom he had four children. In 1992 he began his graduate studies in political science at Simón Bolívar University.

Career
During his studies in Caracas he met Hugo Chávez shortly before the 1992 Venezuelan coup d'état attempts, and through Chávez met Luis Reyes Reyes (who later would be the Governor of Lara between 2000 and 2008). Falcón was elected as a delegate to the 1999 National Constituent Assembly from Lara State.

Mayor
In the regional elections of 2000, he was elected mayor the city of Barquisimeto, Iribarren Municipality, the third most populous city in Venezuela, earning 51.61% of the vote. He was reelected in the regional elections of 2004 with an overwhelming 64.33% of the vote.

Governor of Lara State
Falcón was elected governor of Lara State in 2008, as a candidate of the United Socialist Party of Venezuela (PSUV), with 73.15% of the votes.

As governor Falcón did not support the 2009 Venezuelan Constitutional Referendum, which was ultimately supported by the Venezuelan electorate.

He was re-elected in 2012, as a candidate of the Democratic Unity Roundtable (MUD) opposition coalition, with 54.35% of the votes.

Party switch
In 2007, Movimiento V República (MVR, "Fifth Republic Movement"), of which Falcón was a member, was transformed into the United Socialist Party of Venezuela (PSUV). On 21 February 2010 Governor Falcón gave a letter to President Hugo Chávez declaring his resignation from the PSUV to join the more independent pro-government party Patria Para Todos (PPT, "Fatherland for All"), and to become a member of the latter party's national directorate. Falcón declared that "The relation between a Head of state and the governors and mayors cannot be limited to the emission of instructions or orders without the minimum opportunity that we can confront points of view, to analyze the pros and the cons of your determined initiatives and to revise or to revoke decisions that, after their execution, turn out to be harmful or objections to the interest of the region or of the country".

In June 2012, Falcón announced the creation of a new political party, Progressive Advance, that was aligned with the opposition coalition (known as MUD), and thus supported the candidacy of Henrique Capriles against incumbent President Hugo Chávez in the 2012 Venezuelan presidential election.

In January 2018, Falcón announced he will be running for president, as a candidate of the Progressive Advance party, in the upcoming Venezuelan snap election scheduled for 30 April 2018 but was delayed to 20 May 2018.

Political views

Domestic 
Falcón has stated that he was once a Chavista, though he separated from the movement when he began to disagree with its direction. When Falcón left PSUV in 2010, he criticized the party believing there was a lack of space between Hugo Chávez and Venezuelan officials, stating "The relationship between a head of state and governors and mayors cannot simply issuing instructions or orders without the slightest chance that we can confront points of view, analyze the pros and cons of certain initiatives and to revise or revoke decisions after their execution, are harmful or inconvenience to the interest of the region or the country". He also believed that PSUV was "undermined by bureaucracy, lack of discussion, patronage, groupism, and a poorly understood concept of loyalty". Falcón was also criticized at the time for meeting with opposition students who protested against the Venezuelan government.

One of three opposition governors, Falcón, citing the danger of civil unrest, called for dialogue rather than confrontation with the Maduro government in June 2015. Falcón stated that Venezuela's governmental model was "finished" though he cautioned a "jump from one extreme to another". Falcón's ideas and his experience with both the Bolivarian government and the opposition was noted by Reuters which stated Falcón would "be a central figure" of a transitional government in Venezuela.

International 
Falcon has disagreed with the mainstream opposition approach. In March 2015, U.S. President Obama issued an executive order declaring Venezuela a national security threat and imposing sanctions on seven Venezuelan officials accused of human rights abuses; Falcón described the order as "threatening," "interventionist and unfriendly", saying the tone was "disrespectful" not just to the government but to all Venezuelans. He said he regarded the sanctions as an intrusion into the internal affairs of the country, as well as a disservice to Venezuela's political opposition.

References 

Living people
1961 births
Governors of Lara (state)
Mayors of places in Venezuela
Fifth Republic Movement politicians
United Socialist Party of Venezuela politicians
Fatherland for All politicians
Progressive Advance politicians
People from Yaracuy
People of the Crisis in Venezuela
Members of the Venezuelan Constituent Assembly of 1999